Miss B Hollywood (born June 26, 1989) is an American self-styled singer and songwriting hip hop artist, hailing from Memphis, Tennessee.

Born in Jackson, Mississippi, and raised in Memphis, she attended Bishop Byrne High School and Southaven High School in Memphis. Miss B Hollywood excelled in her studies and upon graduation was immediately granted a full scholarship to Berea College in Berea, Kentucky (*all admitted students are granted the equivalent of a full scholarship at Berea). She emerged onto the hip hop scene in 2008, with her single "Fall Up In Da Club", which was promoted by actress and model LisaRaye. At the time, Miss B's style of music could be described as "Dirty South", but in 2009 she decided to broaden her horizons and fan base and changed genres to clean and positive pop music. Her follow-up single, "Reconsider", was a product of this shift and was Miss B Hollywood's first single to receive radio play. Following Reconsider, Miss B Hollywood landed corporate sponsorships with Voodoo Tiki Tequila and Coors Light.

Having performed alongside artists such as Jazmine Sullivan, Chris Brown, Three 6 Mafia, Pleasure P, Soulja Boy, and others, Miss B Hollywood embarked on a solo four-month college tour in the US in 2009, including shows with Atlantic Records artist Trey Songz. The success of Reconsider also landed her as an opening act for the 2009 Universoul Circus. She won the Next Big Thing Contest held by Memphis radio station K-97.1 FM in March 2009, beating out over 1,700 other contestants. Since then, Miss B Hollywood has performed at Expo 2010 in Shanghai, China, representing the US along with Bobby Rush and others, after which she toured in New Zealand and Australia.

In 2010, Miss B Hollywood recorded "Fist Pump Music". According to an interview with Black Cherry magazine, the concept of the song came from: "As a recording artist I work with Prize Fight Boxing and I bring their boxers into the ring while rapping a song of mine, usually boxer Dedrick Bell. I was preparing to perform live for an upcoming fight that would be featured on Showtime and Fox Sport South and I needing something suitable to boxing and came up with fist pump music. After I finished the song, my brother asks me "Have you heard of Jersey Shore, they fist pump, you should pitch the song to the show", and I did."

Miss B Hollywood is working on her début album, to be titled Tinseltown. A release date has yet to be determined.

Discography
 2008 Single - "Fall Up In Da Club" featuring Gangsta Boo from Three 6 Mafia
 2009 Mixtape - Tipsy Off Tequila featuring Trey Songz and Rick Ross
 2009 Single - "Reconsider"
 2010 Single - "Na Na"
 2010 Single - "Fist Pump Music"
 2011 Single-  "Good To You"

References

1989 births
Living people
American hip hop musicians
People from Memphis, Tennessee
Berea College alumni